Bring 'Em In may refer to:

 Bring 'Em In (Mando Diao album), 2002
 Bring 'Em In (Buddy Guy album), 2005

See also
Bring 'Em All In, a 1995 album by Mike Scott